Sidi Boubekeur District is a district of Saïda Province, Algeria.

Districts of Saïda Province